Kris Dayanti Trenggono (born 24 March 1975), often written mononymously as Krisdayanti (or shortened as KD), is an Indonesian singer and actress. She is the younger sister of Yuni Shara, another Indonesian singer. She is the daughter of Trenggono and Rachma Widadiningsih. At the age of 9, she sang a song for the movie Megaloman. On three years later, she released her first album, Biasa Saja, together with the soundtrack album for Catatan Si Emon. While still in high school, Yanti participated in numerous singing and modelling competitions. In 1991, she was a finalist in the GADIS Sampul competition.

With the help of Younky Soewarno and Chris Pattikawa, Yanti participated in the 1992 Asia Bagus star-search program, eventually winning the grand prize at the Asia Bagus film festival in Japan.  As a result of her winning the Asia Bagus competition, Yanti recorded an album in Singapore with Pony Canyon as well as a single which only saw airplay in Singapore and Japan. In 1997, she was chosen as "The Best of Asia Bagus". She also won several awards, such as Best Indonesian Album awards for "Menghitung Hari" at 1999 Anugerah Industri Muzik, "Most Wanted Female Artist" and "Most Wanted Indonesian Video" awards for "Menghitung Hari" at MTV Southeast Asia, Best Pop Album awards for "Cinta" at 1997 Anugerah Musik Indonesia, and Most Favorite Female for "Jangan Pergi, Yang Kumau" at 2002 MTV Indonesia Awards. And also several nominations, such as Best Female Supporting Role for "Abad 21" at 1996 Festival Sinetron Indonesia, International Viewer's Choice Awards for "Menghitung Hari" at 1999 MTV Video Music Awards, and Most Favorite Female for "Mengenangmu" at 2006 MTV Indonesia Awards. During the duration of 2004, Yanti held eight concerts in different cities, including some international ones.

Her hit songs and constant concert performances have caused her to be considered the most expensive Indonesian artists to hire for singing or acting, with Swa magazine writing that she earns more than the president of Indonesia. In 1996, she was considered by Tabloid Bintang as one of Indonesia's 6 most prominent female television stars, and in 2007 Globe Asia ranked her 31st in its list of the 99 influential women in Indonesia.

She married Anang Hermansyah, a musician from Jember, East Java, in 1996. Together they had one son (Azriel Hermansyah) and one daughter (Aurelie Hermansyah). During their marriage, tabloids often reported rumors of Yanti being linked to Dicky Wahyudi, Tohpati's guitarist, dan Ari Sigit, a grandson of ex-president Suharto. All rumors were denied by Yanti, who said that her relationship with her husband was fine. They divorced in mid-August 2009, upon Yanti's request.

After divorcing from Anang Hermansyah, she reportedly started a relationship with Raul Lemos, a businessman from East Timor.
On 20 March 2011, she married Raul Lemos and she had another girl at 5 September 2011 by cesarean section. The name of the girl is Arianna Amora Lemos, which means "Diamond with Full of Love". She then said that she was retiring from the entertainment industry to live in East Timor as a housewife. However, she retracted the statement and said that she wanted to continue singing until old age, similar to Indonesian top senior singer, Titiek Puspa.

Discography

Studio albums
 Biasa Saja (1987)
 Terserah (1995)
 Cinta  (1996)
 Hanya Tuhan  (1996)
 Kasih  (1997)
 Sayang (1998)
 Buah Hati  (1998)
 Menghitung Hari (1999)
 Mencintaimu (2000)
 Makin Aku Cinta  (2000)
 Menuju Terang  (2003)
 Cahaya (2004)
 Krisdayanti (2007)
 CTKD  (2009)

Compilation albums
 Semua Jadi Satu  (2006)
 2 Diva  (2008)
 Aku Wanita Biasa (2009)
 Sepuluh Tahun Pertama  (2006)
 Dilanda Cinta  (2009)
 Persembahan Ratu Cinta (2013)

Live albums
 Konser KD (2001)

Mini albums
 3 Diva (2008)
 Cintaku Kan Selalu Menemanimu (2011)

Soundtrack albums
 Abad 21 (1997)

Filmography

Film

Television

TV commercials

References

Bibliography

External links

 
 Rujakmanis.com: Krisdayanti

1975 births
Living people
Javanese people
Indonesian people of Dutch descent
Anugerah Musik Indonesia winners
English-language singers from Indonesia
21st-century Indonesian women singers
Indonesian pop singers
Indonesian television actresses
People from Batu, East Java
20th-century Indonesian women singers